The  is a river which flows through Tokyo, Japan. Its tributaries include the Kitazawa River and the Karasuyama River.  The river flows into Tokyo Bay near the Tennōzu Isle Station.

The river banks are extensively landscaped and act as an urban green space for communities along its length.  Close to the source of the river in Setagaya, the river is divided vertically between a large underground storm drain and surface level landscaped ornamental stream. At Ōhashi Junction where the river passes under the Route 246 and the Tōmei Expressway, the river re-emerges as a broader, surface level water channel.

The river is a popular venue for cherry blossom viewing in the spring.

Access
Public transportation access to the pedestrianized riverside walking paths include (from North to South):
Ikejiri-Ōhashi Station on the Tōkyū Den-en-toshi Line
Naka-Meguro Station on the Tōkyū Tōyoko Line and Tokyo Metro Hibiya Line
Meguro Station on the JR East Yamanote Line, Tokyo Metro Namboku Line, Toei Mita Line and Tokyu Meguro Line.
Gotanda Station on the on JR East Yamanote Line, Toei Asakusa Line and Tokyu Ikegami Line.

Gallery

See also
 Meguro, Tokyo

References

Rivers of Tokyo
Meguro
Rivers of Japan